Ethmiopsis aganactes is a moth in the family Gelechiidae. It was described by Edward Meyrick in 1935. It is found in Zhejiang, China.

References

Ethmiopsis
Moths described in 1935
Taxa named by Edward Meyrick